is a Japanese manga series written and illustrated by Yoshiaki Sukeno. The manga has been serialized in Shueisha's shōnen manga magazine Jump Square since October 2013, with individual chapters collected into thirty tankōbon volumes as of January 2023. The story revolves around Rokuro Enmado and Benio Adashino, a pair of young and talented exorcists, who (according to a prophecy) are destined to marry and have a child that will be the ultimate exorcist.

The series was adapted into an anime television series by Studio Pierrot, that ran from April 2016 to March 2017. The manga series has been licensed for an English language release in North America by Viz Media, publishing the first volume in July 2015. A video game was developed and published by Bandai Namco Entertainment for the PS Vita and released in January 2017 in Japan.

As of December 2018, three light novels and two spin-off manga series have also been published and released in Japan.

Plot

Rokuro  is a young boy who used to be a powerful aspiring exorcist, before a tragic incident left his friends dead and made him abandon the profession. One day, he has a fateful encounter with Benio Adashino, a girl around his age and a well known exorcist from the east. According to a prophecy, Rokuro and Benio are the "Twin Star Exorcists" and are destined to marry and have a child known as the "Miko" which will be the ultimate exorcist, capable of cleansing all evil spirits (Kegare) from the world and ending the war that has lasted over a millennium.

Media

Manga

Yoshiaki Sukeno began serializing the manga in Shueisha's Jump Square magazine on October 4, 2013. A special chapter was published in Weekly Shōnen Jump in April 2016.

Viz Media licensed the series for publication in North America, with the first volume released on July 7, 2015.

Spin-offs
The first spin-off manga series, Sōsei no Onmyōji: SD Nyoritsuryō!! (双星の陰陽師 SD如律令!!) is a comedy spin-off comic, written by koppy and supervised by Yoshiaki Sukeno. It is published at the official website of the original manga, as well as the magazine Saikyō Jump. The content of this manga is canon, showing personalities of many characters. The compiled volume was published and released on March 3, 2017 in Japan.

The second spin-off manga series,  is a manga adaptation of the light novel Sōsei no Onmyōji: Tenen Jakko, written and illustrated by the same authors. The back-story focuses on the characters, Seigen Amawaka and Yukari Otomi. The spin-off series was launched by Yoshiaki Sukeno on Shueisha's Shonen Jump+ website on August 27, 2018. The compiled volume was published on December 4, 2018 in Japan.

Light novels
As of December 2018, three light novel adaptations have been published and released by Shueisha under its JUMP j-BOOKS imprint. Each novel features a back-story from the perspective of different characters from the main series, serving as prologues to the main story. The light novels are written by Hajime Tanaka and supervised by Yoshiaki Sukeno.

Anime

An anime television adaptation was announced on the January 2016 cover of Jump Square on December 4, 2015. The series is directed by Tomohisa Taguchi and written by Naruhisa Arakawa, with animation by Studio Pierrot. Additionally, Shishō Igarashi is serving as assistant director, Kikuko Sadakata is designing the characters, and Itsuko Takeda is serving as chief animation director. The second opening theme, "Re:Call", is performed by the idol group i☆Ris, while the second ending theme,  is performed by the two-man group Itowokashi (Kashitarō Itō and Ryō Miyada). The third opening theme, "sync" is performed by lol, while the third ending theme "Hide & Seek" is performed by Girlfriend. The fourth opening theme, "Kanadeai" is performed by Itowokoashi, while the fourth ending theme "Hotarubi" is performed by Wagakki Band.

The series began airing on April 6, 2016 on TV Tokyo and other TX Network stations, and later on AT-X and ended on March 29, 2017 with 50 episodes aired. Animax Asia aired the series with English Subtitles. Crunchyroll is simulcasting the series worldwide outside of Asia, and also released the series on Blu-ray + DVD with an English dub. Part 1 (Episodes 1-13) has been released on July 24, 2018 with a collector's box to store the later three parts, and Part 2 (Episodes 14-26) on September 18, 2018. Part 3 (Episodes 27-40) was released on November 13, 2018, and Part 4 (Episodes 41-50) on January 8, 2019. Chinese streaming site iQiyi has listed the series with fifty episodes.

The anime is licensed in North America and the United Kingdom by Crunchyroll, with home video distribution handled by Funimation in North America and by Anime Limited in the UK.

Video game
A video game adaptation of the series from Bandai Namco Entertainment was announced on September 3, 2016. The battle adventure game was released for PlayStation Vita, and features Rokuro as a playable character. It features an alternate setup with five different girls as candidates for the title of Twin Star, including Benio, Mayura, and three other characters designed exclusively for the game by original creator Yoshiaki Sukeno. The game was released to Japan on January 26, 2017.

Reception
Volume 1 reached 11th place on the weekly Oricon manga charts, with 29,527 copies sold; volume 2 reached 23rd place, with 30,734 copies; volume 3 reached 46th place, with 38,835 copies; volume 4 reached 24th place, with 37,900 copies; volume 5 also reached 24th place, with 47,489 copies; volume 6 reached 32nd place, with 48,029 copies; volume 7 reached 20th place, with 48,762 copies; and volume 8 reached 11th place, with 56,947 copies. As of March 1, 2021, Twin Star Exorcists had over 5 million copies in circulation.

Volume 3 of the English translation appeared on the New York Times Manga Best Sellers list for two non-consecutive weeks, first at 8th place and then at 6th.

See also
List of series run in Jump Square
Good Luck Girl!, another manga series made by the same author

References

External links
  on the Jump Square website 
  
 

2013 manga
2016 anime television series debuts
2017 video games
Adventure anime and manga
Crunchyroll anime
Exorcism in anime and manga
Funimation
Jump J-Books
Pierrot (company)
PlayStation Vita games
PlayStation Vita-only games
Romance anime and manga
Shōnen manga
Shueisha franchises
Shueisha manga
Supernatural anime and manga
TV Tokyo original programming
Viz Media manga